Confess is a 2005 American independent feature film written and directed by Stefan Schaefer.

Plot
Terroll Lessor, a computer genius in an unpleasant job, decides to use his skills against reprehensible parts of society. Along with his girlfriend, played by Ali Larter, he gains embarrassing information on people whom he believes to be immoral and exposes this information to the public. This garners the attention of police and people who wish him harm, and results in copy-cat crimes by others who admire him.

Cast

Festivals and distribution
Confess had its world premiere at the Hamptons International Film Festival, where Stefan Schaefer won the Best Screenwriter award. It also screened at Method Fest Independent Film Festival, where Eugene Byrd won the Break-Out Acting Award, as well as markets in Berlin, Cannes and Hong Kong.

The film was produced by Ben Odell and Jonathan Stern of Centrifugal Films, in association with Cicala Filmworks. The film is distributed by New Films International and MTI.

External links 
Official Website

 

2005 films
2005 thriller films
American independent films
Films directed by Stefan Schaefer
American thriller films
2005 independent films
2000s English-language films
2000s American films